4797 Ako, provisional designation , is a stony Nysian asteroid from the inner regions of the asteroid belt, approximately 5 kilometers in diameter. It was discovered on 30 September 1989, by the Japanese astronomers Toshiro Nomura and Kōyō Kawanishi at the Minami-Oda Observatory, Japan. The asteroid was named for the Japanese city of Akō.

Orbit and classification 

Ako is a member of the stony subgroup of the Nysa family, which is named after its largest member 44 Nysa. It orbits the Sun in the inner main-belt at a distance of 2.0–2.9 AU once every 3 years and 9 months (1,369 days). Its orbit has an eccentricity of 0.18 and an inclination of 2° with respect to the ecliptic.

Physical characteristics

Rotation period 

A rotational lightcurve of Ako was obtained for the first time from photometric observations made at the U.S. Ricky Observatory, Missouri, in November 2008. It gave a well-defined rotation period of  hours with a relatively high brightness variation of 0.90 in magnitude, indicative of a non-spheroidal shape.

Diameter and albedo 

According to NASA's space-based Wide-field Infrared Survey Explorer with its subsequent NEOWISE mission, Ako measures 6.0 kilometers in diameter and its surface has an albedo of 0.11, while the Collaborative Asteroid Lightcurve Link (CALL) assumes a standard albedo for stony asteroids of 0.21, and calculates a diameter of 4.0 kilometers, as the higher the albedo (reflectivity), the smaller a body's diameter for a certain absolute magnitude (brightness).

Naming 

This minor planet was named for the city of Akō in the Hyōgo Prefecture, Japan, and for its ancient castle on the Seto Inland Sea.

Known for its salt production, Ako is the birthplace of the fictional account of Chūshingura, a tale about the forty-seven Ronin who committed seppuku after avenging their master. The city is also the home of the second discoverer's private Minami-Oda observatory, where Kōyō Kawanishi observes small Solar System bodies. The official naming citation was published by the Minor Planet Center on 27 June 1991.

References

External links 
 Asteroid Lightcurve Database (LCDB), query form (info )
 Dictionary of Minor Planet Names, Google books
 Asteroids and comets rotation curves, CdR – Observatoire de Genève, Raoul Behrend
 Discovery Circumstances: Numbered Minor Planets (1)-(5000) – Minor Planet Center
 
 

004797
Discoveries by Toshiro Nomura
Discoveries by Kōyō Kawanishi
Named minor planets
19890930